John Hunter House may refer to:

John Hunter House (Logana, Kentucky), listed on the National Register of Historic Places (NRHP) in Jessamine County
John W. Hunter House, Birmingham, Michigan, NRHP-listed in Oakland County
John Hunter House (Franklin, Tennessee), NRHP-listed in Williamson County

See also
Jacob Hunter House (New Liberty, Kentucky), NRHP-listed in Owen County